Steve Sullivan (born July 6, 1974) is a Canadian former professional ice hockey player who played over 1000 games in the National Hockey League for the New Jersey Devils, Toronto Maple Leafs, Chicago Blackhawks, Nashville Predators, Pittsburgh Penguins and Arizona Coyotes. He was also a former coach and executive with the Coyotes.

Playing career

Early years
In the OHL, Sullivan played with the Sault Ste. Marie Greyhounds and won the 1993 Memorial Cup.

New Jersey Devils
Sullivan was taken by the New Jersey Devils in the 1994 NHL Entry Draft ninth round, 233rd overall. He was assigned to play with  the Albany River Rats, where he captured a Calder Cup championship in 1995.

Toronto Maple Leafs
Sullivan was traded to the Toronto Maple Leafs during the 1996–97 NHL season, where he went on to score a (then) career high 40 points during the 1998–99 NHL season.

Chicago Blackhawks
Sullivan was then picked up off waivers in 1999 by the Chicago Blackhawks. Sullivan posted a new career high of 75 points in the 2001–02 NHL season.

Nashville Predators
Sullivan was traded to the Nashville Predators for a second-round pick in the 2005 NHL Entry Draft (Michael Blunden) and a second-round pick in the 2004 NHL Entry Draft (Ryan Garlock) on February 16, 2004.

Upon arriving in Nashville, Sullivan put up 30 points in 24 games, including a hat trick in his first game with the Predators, and 10 points in his first 3 games with the team. Sullivan was named the NHL's Offensive Player of the Week for October 9–16, 2005.

In February 2007, Sullivan suffered a debilitating back injury in a game against the Montreal Canadiens that forced him out of action for the remainder of the  season, all of the  season, and the first half of the  season. Sullivan made his comeback on January 10, 2009, against the Chicago Blackhawks after nearly 23 months. Due to his successful comeback during the 2008–09 season, Sullivan was awarded the Bill Masterton Memorial Trophy for his perseverance, sportsmanship, and dedication to hockey.

Pittsburgh Penguins
On July 1, 2011, he signed a one-year contract worth $1.5 million with the Pittsburgh Penguins. His early form in the 2011–12 season was disappointing, but as the season went on, he became better accustomed to the Penguins' lineup and finished with 48 points in 79 games. He scored two goals in the Penguins opening round playoff loss to the Philadelphia Flyers.

Final NHL season
On July 4, 2012, Sullivan signed a one-year, $1.85 million deal with the Phoenix Coyotes. Signed with the intention to cover the loss of fellow veteran Ray Whitney, Sullivan got off to a quick start with the Coyotes in the lockout shortened 2012–13 season, scoring a hat-trick in his third game to help defeat the Columbus Blue Jackets on January 24, 2013. On March 28, 2013, Sullivan dressed for his 1,000th NHL game, fittingly against the Nashville Predators. He was honored during the game as the Coyotes defeated the Predators 7-4.

On April 3, 2013, Sullivan was dealt by the Coyotes at the trade deadline to return to his original club, the New Jersey Devils, for a 7th round draft pick. His time between stints with the Devils was 16 year, 45 days, the third longest amount of time between stints with one team in NHL history.

Post-Playing career
On September 8, 2014, the Coyotes announced that they had hired Sullivan as their development coach.

On July 26, 2020, Sullivan was named the interim general manager of the Coyotes upon the resignation of John Chayka, running the NHL franchise till Bill Armstrong was hired as the new general manager in September 2020. Less than 5 months later, Sullivan was let go from this position as assistant general manager and executive vice-president of hockey operations on February 11, 2021.

Career statistics

Regular season and playoffs

International

References

External links

1974 births
Living people
Albany River Rats players
Arizona Coyotes coaches
Arizona Coyotes executives
Bill Masterton Memorial Trophy winners
Canadian ice hockey left wingers
Chicago Blackhawks players
Ice hockey people from Ontario
Nashville Predators players
New Jersey Devils draft picks
New Jersey Devils players
Phoenix Coyotes players
Pittsburgh Penguins players
Sault Ste. Marie Greyhounds players
Sportspeople from Timmins
Toronto Maple Leafs players
Canadian ice hockey coaches